The Wollenberg is a hill in Hesse, Germany.

Mountains of Hesse
Mountains and hills of the Rhenish Massif